Gerald Wayne Grote (born October 6, 1942) is an American former professional baseball player. He played the majority of his Major League Baseball career as a catcher for the New York Mets, catching every inning of the franchise's first two World Series appearances, and would appear in two more World Series for the Los Angeles Dodgers. He was a two-time All-Star for the National League and is regarded as one of the best defensive catchers of his era.

Early life
Grote was raised in San Antonio, Texas. When he was ten years old, he and his family were caught in an F-4 tornado. His mother, father and two sisters made it to safety, however, he lost his grandmother in the storm. Grote attended Douglas MacArthur High School, where he played on the baseball team as a pitcher, catcher and third baseman. As a high school pitcher, he threw a no-hitter and a one hitter. Grote played for Trinity University in 1962, and led the Tigers in batting average (.413), home runs (five), RBI (19), runs (29), and hits (31).

Major League career

Houston Colt .45s
After one season at Trinity University, Grote was signed as an amateur free agent by the Houston Colt .45s in 1962, and was assigned to play for their minor league affiliate, the San Antonio Bullets. At the age of 20, he made his major league debut with the Colt .45s on September 21, 1963 as a late-inning defensive replacement for John Bateman, and hit a sacrifice fly to score Bob Aspromonte in his only at-bat. For the season he appeared in three games, including on September 27, when every starter in the Colts' line-up was a rookie.

In 1964, Grote platooned with Bateman behind the plate; however, the Colts also experimented with young catchers Dave Adlesh and John Hoffman, as neither Grote nor Bateman hit for a very high average that season (.181 and .190, respectively). Grote was the Colts' catcher on April 23, when Ken Johnson became the first pitcher in major league history to lose a complete game no-hitter in nine innings.

In 1965, the newly renamed Houston Astros remained unsettled behind the plate, with former All-Star Gus Triandos and prospect Ron Brand being added to the mix. Grote spent the entire season with Houston's Triple-A Pacific Coast League affiliate, the Oklahoma City 89ers, where he batted .265 with eleven home runs. At the end of the season, he was traded to the New York Mets for pitcher Tom Parsons.

New York Mets
Grote became the starting catcher for the Mets immediately upon his arrival in New York City. Grote earned a reputation with his teammates and opponents as highly competitive, developing the trademark of rolling the ball to the far side of the pitcher's mound (closest to the Mets' dugout) while leaving the field after his pitcher ended an inning with a strikeout. This necessitated the opposing team's pitcher having to walk further to stoop and retrieve the ball.

In 1968, Grote was hitting over .300 at mid-season and was recognized as one of the top catchers in the National League when he was selected to be the starting catcher in the 1968 All-Star Game. He became only the second Met player in franchise history after Ron Hunt to earn a starting role in an All-Star game. Grote was hitless in two at-bats during the game. He ended the year with a .282 batting average along with three home runs and 31 runs batted in.

The 1969 season would be a memorable one for Grote and the Mets. The Chicago Cubs had been in first place since the beginning of the season and had a nine-game lead as late as August 15. However, the Cubs began to falter while the Mets continued to play well. When the two teams met for a two-game series on September 8, the Mets won both games to move just a half game behind the Cubs. Aside from calling Tom Seaver's five-hit pitching performance in the second game, Grote drove in the Mets' seventh and final run of the game. The following day, the Mets swept the Montreal Expos in a doubleheader, with Grote catching all 21 innings. Coupled with a Cubs loss, the Mets moved into first place for the first time in their history. The Mets stayed in the lead for the rest of the season, finishing with a 37–11 record in their final 48 games while the Cubs slumped to a 9–17 record in their final 26 games, and clinched the National League Eastern Division title on September 24.

Grote finished the season with a .252 average and produced career-highs with six home runs and 40 runs batted in, but it was his defensive skills that proved most valuable for the Mets. Grote posted a .991 fielding percentage and his 56.3% caught stealing percentage was second-best among National League catchers. He was also given credit for guiding the Mets young pitching staff that led the league in victories and shutouts and finished second in team earned run average.

The Mets went on to sweep the Atlanta Braves in the 1969 National League Championship Series, but were heavy underdogs heading into the 1969 World Series against the Baltimore Orioles. Following a 4–1 loss in the series opener with Cy Young award winner Seaver on the mound, it seemed as if the Mets had little chance against the Orioles. However, the Mets bounced back, winning the next four games to capture their first world championship. Besides catching every inning in the postseason, Grote contributed offensively with a single in Game Two to keep a ninth inning rally alive and Al Weis followed with the game-winning hit. With Game Four tied, Grote doubled to start the tenth inning, then pinch runner Rod Gaspar scored the winning run when an errant throw hit J.C. Martin on the wrist. With Grote calling the pitches, the Mets pitching staff held the Orioles hitters to a .146 batting average during the series.

Grote and the 1969 Mets became an improbable part of baseball history. In their previous seven seasons the Mets had finished in last place five times. Their sudden turn of fortune in 1969 and their subsequent upset victory in the World Series stunned the sports world and became one of the more storied events in baseball lore. The team became known as the Miracle Mets.

In 1972, Grote played in only 64 games due to injuries and in late September he had surgery to remove bone chips from his right elbow.

In May 1973, Grote broke a bone in his right arm when he was hit by a pitch and went on the disabled list for two months. When he returned in mid-July, the Mets began winning, climbing from last place on August 30 to win the National League Eastern Division pennant. They then proceeded to defeat the heavily favored Cincinnati Reds in the 1973 National League Championship Series. In the World Series, the Mets took the Oakland Athletics to the seventh and final game, before they were defeated. Looking back on his two pennant-winning seasons with the Mets, Grote said, "It (the 1969 season) was no miracle. Now, '73 was a miracle."

In , Grote was batting .287 with four home runs and 27 runs batted in to earn his second All-Star selection, however, injuries were beginning to take their toll and he split the catching duties with Duffy Dyer. Grote rebounded in 1975, posting a career-high .295 batting average in 119 games and led all National League catchers with a .995 fielding percentage. At Veterans Stadium on July 4, 1975, Grote stepped in as a pinch hitter against longtime teammate Tug McGraw, who had been traded to the Philadelphia Phillies during the off-season. With the Mets down 3–2, Grote connected for a game-winning two-run home run.

In August, after 12 seasons with the Mets, he was traded to the Los Angeles Dodgers for two players to be named later.

Los Angeles Dodgers and Kansas City Royals
Shortly after joining the Dodgers, Grote struck out in his only career at-bat against former battery-mate Tom Seaver, who was now with the Reds. During his two seasons with the Dodgers, he played part-time as a backup to Steve Yeager and appeared in two World Series against the New York Yankees. He retired from professional baseball after the  season, only to be lured out of retirement in 1981 by the Kansas City Royals, who were experiencing a shortage of catchers. On June 3, at the age of 38, Grote went 3 for 4 with a grand slam home run, a double, and a stolen base, driving in a team-record seven runs. After another short stint with the Dodgers, he retired for good after the  season.

Career statistics
In a 16-year major league career, Grote played in 1,421 games, accumulating 1,092 hits in 4,339 at bats for a .252 career batting average along with 39 home runs and 404 runs batted in. He ended his career with a .991 fielding percentage, which at the time of his retirement was eighth highest all-time among catchers. On April 22, Grote set a major league record with 20 putouts in a game when Tom Seaver threw 19 strikeouts against the San Diego Padres. He is the Mets all-time leader in games played as a catcher (1,176). Grote caught 116 shutouts in his career, ranking him 15th all-time among catchers.

Grote called the pitches for some of the most outstanding pitchers of his era, including Tom Seaver, Jerry Koosman, Tug McGraw, Nolan Ryan, Tommy John, Don Sutton, and Dan Quisenberry. He possessed a strong and accurate throwing arm against opposing baserunners. Hall of Fame inductee Lou Brock found Grote to be one of the most difficult catchers on which to attempt a stolen base, and though Hall of Fame catcher Johnny Bench was the perennial Gold Glove winner during their careers in the National League together, Bench once said of Grote, "If Grote and I were on the same team, I would be playing third base."

<div align="left">

Post retirement and honors
After his playing career had ended, Grote spent  as manager of the Lakeland Tigers and the Birmingham Barons. In , he played for the St. Lucie Legends in the Senior Professional Baseball Association. In , he was inducted into the San Antonio Sports Hall of Fame. On October 8, 2011, Grote was inducted into the Trinity University Athletic Hall of Fame.

Grote appeared as a Mystery Guest on the television game show What's My Line?.  He can also be seen as a TV guest star, along with his other 1969 N.Y. Met teammates, on Everybody Loves Raymonds episode of "Big Shots", filmed in 1999.

In 2010 and 2011, Grote was color commentator with Mike Capps on the Round Rock Express (PCL) radio home broadcasts.

Personal life
Grote has three children, Sandy, Jeff and Jennifer and six grandchildren.

Grote and his wife, Cheryl, were married on November 16, 1997. They met in San Antonio, Texas and moved to Belton, Texas in January 2008.  He is the step-father to Cheryl's triplets, Laurel, Joseph and Jacob and step-grandfather to her two grandchildren.

Grote's current interests are church, family, baseball, gardening, and volunteering for the Belton Police Department.

References

External links

Jerry Grote home page

"69 Mets Remembered: Where Have They Gone?", Baseball Digest, August 1999
Ultimate Mets database: Jerry Grote
Baseball Almanac: Jerry Grote

1942 births
Living people
Baseball players from San Antonio
Birmingham Barons managers
Birmingham Barons players
Contestants on American game shows
Douglas MacArthur High School (San Antonio) alumni
Florida Instructional League Mets players
Houston Colt .45s players
Kansas City Royals players
Los Angeles Dodgers players
Major League Baseball catchers
National League All-Stars
New York Mets players
Oklahoma City 89ers players
Tiburones de La Guaira players
American expatriate baseball players in Venezuela
San Antonio Bullets players
St. Lucie Legends players
Trinity Tigers baseball players